In number theory, a regular prime is a special kind of prime number, defined by Ernst Kummer in 1850 to prove certain cases of Fermat's Last Theorem. Regular primes may be defined via the divisibility of either class numbers or of Bernoulli numbers.

The first few regular odd primes are:
 3, 5, 7, 11, 13, 17, 19, 23, 29, 31, 41, 43, 47, 53, 61, 71, 73, 79, 83, 89, 97, 107, 109, 113, 127, 137, 139, 151, 163, 167, 173, 179, 181, 191, 193, 197, 199, ... .

History and motivation
In 1850, Kummer proved that Fermat's Last Theorem is true for a prime exponent p if p is regular. This focused attention on the irregular primes. In 1852, Genocchi was able to prove that the first case of Fermat's Last Theorem is true for an exponent p, if  is not an irregular pair. Kummer improved this further in 1857 by showing that for the "first case" of Fermat's Last Theorem (see Sophie Germain's theorem) it is sufficient to establish that either  or  fails to be an irregular pair.

Kummer found the irregular primes less than 165. In 1963, Lehmer reported results up to 10000 and Selfridge and Pollack announced in 1964 to have completed the table of irregular primes up to 25000.

Definition

Class number criterion
An odd prime number p is defined to be regular if it does not divide the class number of the p-th cyclotomic field Q(ζp), where ζp is a primitive p-th root of unity.

The prime number 2 is often considered regular as well.

The class number of the cyclotomic
field is the number of ideals of the ring of integers
Z(ζp) up to equivalence. Two ideals I, J are considered equivalent if there is a nonzero u in Q(ζp) so that .

Kummer's criterion

Kummer's proof that this is equivalent to the class number definition is strengthened by the Herbrand–Ribet theorem, which states certain consequences of p dividing one of these Bernoulli numbers.

Siegel's conjecture
It has been conjectured that there are infinitely many regular primes. More precisely  conjectured  that e−1/2, or about 60.65%, of all prime numbers are regular, in the asymptotic sense of natural density. Neither conjecture has been proven to date.

Irregular primes 
An odd prime that is not regular is an irregular prime (or Bernoulli irregular or B-irregular to distinguish from other types or irregularity discussed below). The first few irregular primes are:

 37, 59, 67, 101, 103, 131, 149, 157, 233, 257, 263, 271, 283, 293, 307, 311, 347, 353, 379, 389, 401, 409, 421, 433, 461, 463, 467, 491, 523, 541, 547, 557, 577, 587, 593, ...

Infinitude
K. L. Jensen (an otherwise unknown student of Nielsen) proved in 1915 that there are infinitely many irregular primes of the form .

In 1954 Carlitz gave a simple proof of the weaker result that there are in general infinitely many irregular primes.

Irregular pairs

In other words, an irregular pair is a bookkeeping device to record, for an irregular prime p, the particular indices of the Bernoulli numbers at which regularity fails. The first few irregular pairs (when ordered by k) are:

 (691, 12), (3617, 16), (43867, 18), (283, 20), (617, 20), (131, 22), (593, 22), (103, 24), (2294797, 24), (657931, 26), (9349, 28), (362903, 28), ... .

The smallest even k such that nth irregular prime divides Bk are
32, 44, 58, 68, 24, 22, 130, 62, 84, 164, 100, 84, 20, 156, 88, 292, 280, 186, 100, 200, 382, 126, 240, 366, 196, 130, 94, 292, 400, 86, 270, 222, 52, 90, 22, ... 

For a given prime p, the number of such pairs is called the index of irregularity of p.  Hence, a prime is regular if and only if its index of irregularity is zero. Similarly, a prime is irregular if and only if its index of irregularity is positive.

Irregular index
The first irregular prime with irregular index greater than 1 is 157, which divides B62 and B110, so it has an irregular index 2. Clearly, the irregular index of a regular prime is 0.

The irregular index of the nth prime is
0, 0, 0, 0, 0, 0, 0, 0, 0, 0, 1, 0, 0, 0, 0, 1, 0, 1, 0, 0, 0, 0, 0, 0, 1, 1, 0, 0, 0, 0, 1, 0, 0, 1, 0, 2, 0, 0, 0, 0, 0, 0, 0, 0, 0, 0, 0, 0, 0, 1, 0, 0, 0, 1, 1, 0, 1, 0, 0, 1, 1, 1, 1, 0, 0, 0, 0, 1, 0, 2, 0, ... (Start with n = 2, or the prime = 3) 

The irregular index of the nth irregular prime is
1, 1, 1, 1, 1, 1, 1, 2, 1, 1, 1, 1, 1, 1, 1, 1, 1, 2, 2, 1, 1, 1, 1, 1, 1, 1, 2, 3, 1, 1, 2, 1, 1, 2, 1, 1, 1, 3, 1, 2, 3, 1, 1, 2, 1, 1, 2, 1, 1, 1, 1, 1, 1, 2, 1, 1, 1, 1, 1, 1, 1, 2, 1, 1, 1, 1, 1, 1, 3, 1, 1, 1, ... 

The primes having irregular index 1 are
37, 59, 67, 101, 103, 131, 149, 233, 257, 263, 271, 283, 293, 307, 311, 347, 389, 401, 409, 421, 433, 461, 463, 523, 541, 557, 577, 593, 607, 613, 619, 653, 659, 677, 683, 727, 751, 757, 761, 773, 797, 811, 821, 827, 839, 877, 881, 887, 953, 971, ... 

The primes having irregular index 2 are
157, 353, 379, 467, 547, 587, 631, 673, 691, 809, 929, 1291, 1297, 1307, 1663, 1669, 1733, 1789, 1933, 1997, 2003, 2087, 2273, 2309, 2371, 2383, 2423, 2441, 2591, 2671, 2789, 2909, 2957, ... 

The primes having irregular index 3 are
491, 617, 647, 1151, 1217, 1811, 1847, 2939, 3833, 4003, 4657, 4951, 6763, 7687, 8831, 9011, 10463, 10589, 12073, 13217, 14533, 14737, 14957, 15287, 15787, 15823, 16007, 17681, 17863, 18713, 18869, ... 

The least primes having irregular index n are
2, 3, 37, 157, 491, 12613, 78233, 527377, 3238481, ...

Generalizations

Euler irregular primes
The first few Euler irregular primes are
19, 31, 43, 47, 61, 67, 71, 79, 101, 137, 139, 149, 193, 223, 241, 251, 263, 277, 307, 311, 349, 353, 359, 373, 379, 419, 433, 461, 463, 491, 509, 541, 563, 571, 577, 587, ... 

The Euler irregular pairs are
(61, 6), (277, 8), (19, 10), (2659, 10), (43, 12), (967, 12), (47, 14), (4241723, 14), (228135437, 16), (79, 18), (349, 18), (84224971, 18), (41737, 20), (354957173, 20), (31, 22), (1567103, 22), (1427513357, 22), (2137, 24), (111691689741601, 24), (67, 26), (61001082228255580483, 26), (71, 28), (30211, 28), (2717447, 28), (77980901, 28), ...

Vandiver proved that Fermat's Last Theorem has no solution for integers x, y, z with  if p is Euler-regular. Gut proved that  has no solution if p has an E-irregularity index less than 5.

It was proven that there is an infinity of E-irregular primes. A stronger result was obtained: there is an infinity of E-irregular primes congruent to 1 modulo 8. As in the case of Kummer's B-regular primes, there is as yet no proof that there are infinitely many E-regular primes, though this seems likely to be true.

Strong irregular primes
A prime p is called strong irregular if it's both B-irregular and E-irregular (the indexes of Bernoulli and Euler numbers that are divisible by p can be either the same or different). The first few strong irregular primes are
67, 101, 149, 263, 307, 311, 353, 379, 433, 461, 463, 491, 541, 577, 587, 619, 677, 691, 751, 761, 773, 811, 821, 877, 887, 929, 971, 1151, 1229, 1279, 1283, 1291, 1307, 1319, 1381, 1409, 1429, 1439, ... 

263, 311, 379, 461, 463, 541, 751, 773, 887, 971, 1283, ...

Weak irregular primes
A prime p is weak irregular if it's either B-irregular or E-irregular (or both). The first few weak irregular primes are
19, 31, 37, 43, 47, 59, 61, 67, 71, 79, 101, 103, 131, 137, 139, 149, 157, 193, 223, 233, 241, 251, 257, 263, 271, 277, 283, 293, 307, 311, 347, 349, 353, 373, 379, 389, 401, 409, 419, 421, 433, 461, 463, 491, 509, 523, 541, 547, 557, 563, 571, 577, 587, 593, ... 

Like the Bernoulli irregularity, the weak regularity relates to the divisibility of class numbers of cyclotomic fields. In fact, a prime p is weak irregular if and only if p divides the class number of the 4p-th cyclotomic field Q(ζ4p).

 Weak irregular pairs 

In this section, "an" means the numerator of the nth Bernoulli number if n is even, "an" means the th Euler number if n is odd .

Since for every odd prime p, p divides ap if and only if p is congruent to 1 mod 4, and since p divides the denominator of th Bernoulli number for every odd prime p, so for any odd prime p, p cannot divide ap−1. Besides, if and only if an odd prime p divides an (and 2p does not divide n), then p also divides an+k(p−1) (if 2p divides n, then the sentence should be changed to "p also divides an+2kp". In fact, if 2p divides n and  does not divide n, then p divides an.) for every integer k (a condition is  must be > 1). For example, since 19 divides a11 and  does not divide 11, so 19 divides a18k+11 for all k. Thus, the definition of irregular pair , n should be at most .

The following table shows all irregular pairs with odd prime :

The only primes below 1000 with weak irregular index 3 are 307, 311, 353, 379, 577, 587, 617, 619, 647, 691, 751, and 929. Besides, 491 is the only prime below 1000 with weak irregular index 4, and all other odd primes below 1000 with weak irregular index 0, 1, or 2. (Weak irregular index is defined as "number of integers  such that p divides an.)

The following table shows all irregular pairs with n ≤ 63. (To get these irregular pairs, we only need to factorize an.

The following table shows irregular pairs , it is a conjecture that there are infinitely many irregular pairs  for every natural number , but only few were found for fixed n. For some values of n, even there is no known such prime p''.

See also
Wolstenholme prime

References

Further reading

External links 
 
 Chris Caldwell, The Prime Glossary: regular prime at The Prime Pages.
 Keith Conrad, Fermat's last theorem for regular primes.
 Bernoulli irregular prime
 Euler irregular prime
 Bernoulli and Euler irregular primes.
 Factorization of Bernoulli and Euler numbers
 Factorization of Bernoulli and Euler numbers

Algebraic number theory
Cyclotomic fields
Classes of prime numbers
Unsolved problems in number theory